Bombing of Hong Kong may refer to:
Japanese air raids during the Battle of Hong Kong in December 1941
Allied attacks on the Japanese-occupied colony and shipping sailing nearby as part of the Air raids on the Hong Kong area (1942–1945)